Deianiridae is an extinct taxonomic family of fossil sea snails, marine gastropod mollusks.

References

Prehistoric gastropods